FK Ilinden 1955 is a football club from the village Bašino Selo near Veles, North Macedonia. They are currently competing in the Macedonian Third League (South Division).

History
The club was founded in 1955.

References

External links
Official website 
Club info at MacedonianFootball 
Football Federation of Macedonia 

Ilinden 1955
Association football clubs established in 1955
1955 establishments in the Socialist Republic of Macedonia
Veles Municipality